PANTA Systems was founded in 2002 and headquartered in Santa Clara, California with offices in Austin, Texas and Pune.  PANTA manufactured and sold Data Warehouse Appliances until 2007. The PANTA appliances ran the Oracle 10g database engine on servers and storage manufactured by PANTA and clustered together with an InfiniBand fabric.

PANTA Systems was a foundation member of the Oracle Information Appliance Initiative, since renamed the Oracle Optimized Warehouse Initiative (OWI).  As of 2008, OWI members included Dell/EMC, HP, IBM, SGI and Sun.

PANTA Systems is the only data warehouse appliance vendor to validate their claims of high perform, high availability and low cost with an externally verified world record.

See also
 Business intelligence
 Data mining
 Data marts
 Data warehouse appliance

References

External links
  Oracle Optimized Warehouse Initiative
 TPC

Defunct computer companies of the United States
Companies based in Santa Clara, California
Computer companies established in 2002
Computer companies disestablished in 2007
2002 establishments in California
2007 disestablishments in California